Marco Kehl-Gómez (born 1 May 1992) is a Swiss footballer who plays as a centre back for German club SGV Freiberg.

References

External links
 Profile at DFB.de
 Profile at kicker.de
 

1992 births
Living people
Footballers from Zürich
Swiss men's footballers
Spanish footballers
Swiss people of Spanish descent
Swiss expatriate footballers
Swiss expatriate sportspeople in Germany
Expatriate footballers in Germany
Association football defenders
Grasshopper Club Zürich players
FC Lugano players
SC Pfullendorf players
Chemnitzer FC players
SV Elversberg players
1. FC Saarbrücken players
Rot-Weiss Essen players
Türkgücü München players
SGV Freiberg players
Swiss Super League players
Swiss Challenge League players
3. Liga players
Regionalliga players